The Lawfare Project is an American non-profit think tank and litigation fund that works to protect the  human and civil rights of Jewish and pro-Israel communities worldwide. The Project funds legal actions to protect free speech and civil rights by challenging anti-Semitism and discrimination against Jews.

Overview
Human rights attorney Brooke Goldstein founded the Lawfare Project in 2010. The Lawfare Project describes itself as "the world's only international pro-Israel litigation fund" and states that it "has launched more than 70 lawsuits and legal actions in 16 jurisdictions across the globe." The organization states it "maintains an international network of more than 350 attorneys" to support its work.

The Project defines lawfare as the use of law as a weapon of war, or the wrongful manipulation of international and national law to pervert the original intent of the law. The Project has claimed that the International Criminal Court has attacked Western democracies by making allegations of human rights abuses that undermine public confidence in government.

According to law professor Orde Kittrie, the Lawfare Project has developed innovative legal arguments demonstrating the inconsistency of New York state laws with boycotts of Israel.

Lawsuits
The Lawfare Project has had a longstanding legal battle against Kuwait Airways for its refusal to fly Israeli passengers. The organization represented "an Israeli traveller who booked a ticket with Kuwait Airways to fly from Frankfurt to Bangkok, only to be refused at the last minute when it emerged that he was an Israeli citizen."

Through January 2018, the Lawfare Project's Spanish attorney, Ignacio Wenley Palacios, had secured 46 writs of injunction and court decisions against the Boycotts of Israel in Spain, forcing Barcelona, Castrillon and other cities to rescind anti-Israel laws. According to Palacios, the Lawfare Project had succeeded in establishing a legal doctrine that "boycotts of Israel infringe on human rights, violate free speech and are tantamount to discrimination on account of national origin and personal opinions."

In June 2017, the Lawfare Project and the law firm Winston & Strawn filed a lawsuit against San Francisco State University (SFSU) on behalf of a group of SFSU students and members of the local Jewish community, alleging that the public school had fostered a climate of anti-Semitism "marked by violent threats to the safety of Jewish students on campus." The suit alleged "that the school has violated the plaintiffs' constitutional rights to free speech and equal protection, as well as a provision of the Civil Rights Act." In addition to the federal lawsuit, the Lawfare Project and Winston & Strawn filed a second lawsuit in February 2018 against SFSU in the Superior Court of California for the County of San Francisco. California Superior Court Judge Richard Ulmer Jr. scheduled the trial to take place on March 4, 2019.

In November 2017, the Lawfare Project supported a lawsuit by the Belgian Federation of Jewish Organizations (CCOJB) against a ban on shechita, the Jewish ritual religious slaughter of animals, in Wallonia, Belgium. In January 2018, the Lawfare Project supported a second lawsuit by CCOJB for restrictions on shechita in Flanders.

, the Lawfare Project is preparing a lawsuit against the Irish Occupied Territories Bill, which, if enacted, would criminalize trade with Israeli settlers. It argues that the bill violates European Union trade regulations.

References

External links
 

Think tanks based in the United States
Human rights organizations based in the United States
Legal advocacy organizations in the United States
Civil liberties advocacy groups in the United States
Opposition to antisemitism in the United States
Zionism in the United States
Think tanks established in 2010
2010 establishments in New York City